Bob Lilley may refer to:

 Bob Lilley (soccer) (born 1966), American soccer coach and former player
 Bob Lilley (footballer) (1893–1964), English footballer
 Bob Lilley (British Army soldier) (1914–1981), founding member of the British Special Air Service

See also
 Bob Lilly (born 1939), former American football defensive tackle and photographer